XHHGR-FM is a radio station on 94.1 FM in Villahermosa, Tabasco. The station is an owned and operated outlet of Radio Fórmula.

History
XHHGR began as XEVL-AM 620, receiving its concession on November 16, 1965 and owned by Josefa Landero de Calderón. It soon became XEACM-AM, named after her husband, Tabasco radio pioneer Aquiles Calderón Marchenas. Upon her death, ownership passed to her successors.

In the 1990s, MVS Radio's Tabasco regional affiliate, owned by José Gerardo Gaudiano Peralta, operated this station and XEVT-AM. The callsign was changed to XEHGR-AM for the Gaudiano Rovirosa brothers. (The XEACM callsign was relocated to another station owned by the Calderón family in Cárdenas, now XHACM-FM.)

In 2000, Radio Fórmula bought the station. It received approval to move to FM in 2010.

References

Radio stations in Tabasco
Villahermosa
Radio Fórmula